Baton may refer to:

Stick-like objects
Baton, a type of club
Baton (law enforcement)
Baston (weapon), a type of baton used in Arnis and Filipino Martial Arts
Baton charge, a coordinated tactic for dispersing crowds of people
Baton (conducting), a short thin stick used for directing a musical performance
Baton (military), a symbolic attribute of military or other office
Baton (running), an object transferred by runners in a relay race
Baton sinister, a mark of cadency in heraldry
Baton twirling, a light metal rod used for keeping time, twirling in competitions, etc.
Baton, a smaller version of a baguette
Baton, in stick juggling, the central stick, which is manipulated with the side-sticks (control sticks)
Baton, another word for a batonette, a culinary knife cut
Batons, in the keyboard of a carillon, the stick-like keys used to play the bells
Batons (suit), one of the four suits of playing card in the standard Latin deck
Suit of wands, Batons in the tarot card

Other uses
BATON, a Type 1 block cipher, used by the United States to secure all types of classified information
Baton Bob, a costumed street performer currently based in Atlanta, Georgia
Baton Broadcasting, a Canadian broadcaster, now owned by CTVglobemedia
Baton Broadcasting System, a defunct television system owned by Baton Broadcasting Inc.
Baton Bunny, a Bugs Bunny cartoon of the Looney Tunes series produced in 1958
BATON Overlay or Balanced Tree Over-lay Network, a distributed tree structure for Peer-to-Peer (P2P) systems
Baton Records, a record label
Baton River, a river in the Tasman District of New Zealand

See also
Baton Rouge (disambiguation)
Batton, a surname
Batten (disambiguation)
Batong (disambiguation)
Batoni (disambiguation)